Rüppell's black chat (Myrmecocichla melaena) is a species of bird in the family Muscicapidae. It is found in Eritrea and Ethiopia.

References

Rüppell's black chat
Birds of the Horn of Africa
Rüppell's black chat
Taxonomy articles created by Polbot